Nalgonda district is a district in the Telangana state of India. Nalgonda district has the highest number of mandals in the state with 31 mandals. The district shares boundaries with Suryapet, Rangareddy, Yadadri and Nagarkurnool districts and with the state boundary of Andhra Pradesh.

Etymology 
Nalgonda is derived from two Telugu words Nalla (Black) & Konda (Hills) i.e. Black Hills.

History 

Nalgonda was earlier referred to as Neelagiri, the name given by some local rulers and the name was changed to Nallagonda only after its conquest by Allauddin Bahaman Shah, the founder of Bahmani Sultanate .

The district had a major role in the Telangana Rebellion.

Geography 

Demographics 

 Census of India, the district has a population of 1,618,416. According to the 2011 census, 81.75% of the population spoke Telugu, 11.91% Lambadi and 5.51% Urdu as their first language.

The Krishna River, Musi River, Aleru, Peddavagu, Dindi River, Halia River and Paleru flow through the Nalgonda district.

Economy 

In 2006 the Indian government named Nalgonda one of the country's 250 poorest districts (out of a total of 640). It is one of the thirty-three districts in Telangana currently receiving funds from the Backward Regions Grant Fund Programme (BRGF).

Agriculture 
Nalgonda district is an agrarian district with water resources from the rivers, lakes, canals and ponds. The wells and borewells also support farming in the district. The farmers mainly grow crops such as paddy, and cotton. The climate of the district supports the production of paddy and groundnut seeds.

Geography

Cities 
Nalgonda
Miryalaguda

Towns 

Devarakonda
Nakrekal
Munugode

Villages

Power projects 
Telangana State Power Generation Corporation Limited (TSGENCO) is building Yadadri Thermal Power Plant in Nalgonda District. The 4000 megawatt thermal project is coming up in a phased manner at Veerlapalem in the district. Bharat Heavy Electricals Limited (BHEL) is appointed as the engineering, procurement, and construction (EPC) contractor for the project.

Notable places in district 
 Kurmagiri Narasimha Swamy Temple, Palem ( 16 Miles) from Nalgonda
Latif Saheb Hill in Nalgonda
 Sri Chaya Someshwara Temple -  from Nalgonda
Udaya Samudram - from Nalgonda
Cheruvugattu Shivalayam - 14 km (8.6 mi) from Nalgonda
Devarkonda Fort -  from Nalgonda
Nagarjuna sagar Dam -  from Nalgonda

Administrative divisions 
The district is divided into three revenue divisions: Nalgonda, Miryalaguda, and Devarakonda. These are sub-divided into 31 mandals and has 565 villages. Prashanth Jeevan Patil is the present collector of the district.

Mandals 
The below table categorizes the mandals into their respective revenue divisions in the district:

See also 

Chinna Kaparthy
Dandampally
List of districts in Telangana

References

External links 

Official website
 Nalgonda factfile at APOnline.gov.in
 Neelagiri to Nalgonda. page 160

 
Districts of Telangana